Ismael Santiago López López (born 27 February 1978), sometimes known simply as Ismael, is a Spanish retired footballer who played mainly as an attacking midfielder.

During ten seasons, he amassed Segunda División totals of 276 matches and 28 goals in representation of eight clubs, mainly Murcia and Xerez (two years apiece).

Club career
Born in Jaén, Andalusia, López started playing for FC Barcelona's B-team, representing the side in the second and third divisions. He moved to Deportivo Alavés in 1998, making his La Liga debut on 25 October 1998 in a 0–1 home loss against CF Extremadura, but he was not very successful there, finishing the season with CD Logroñés also in the second level.

López's career blossomed at Real Murcia, and he was instrumental in the side's top flight promotion in his second season after scoring 11 goals. This prompted the interest of Real Betis, where he was an important attacking element in 2003–04, being however rarely used in the following campaign as the latter won the Copa del Rey and achieved qualification honours to the UEFA Champions League after finishing fourth.

Subsequently, López returned to division two, having stints with Elche CF, Xerez CD, Hércules CF and Alicante CF. From January–June 2010 he played in the third tier with CF Sporting Mahonés and, at 32, moved abroad for the first time in his career, signing with Pierikos F.C. of the Greek second division.

Honours
Murcia
Segunda División: 2002–03

Betis
Copa del Rey: 2004–05

References

External links

1978 births
Living people
Footballers from Jaén, Spain
Spanish footballers
Association football midfielders
La Liga players
Segunda División players
Segunda División B players
FC Barcelona C players
FC Barcelona Atlètic players
Deportivo Alavés players
CD Logroñés footballers
Granada CF footballers
CF Extremadura footballers
Real Murcia players
Real Betis players
Elche CF players
Xerez CD footballers
Hércules CF players
Alicante CF footballers
CF Sporting Mahonés players
Football League (Greece) players
Pierikos F.C. players
Spain youth international footballers
Spanish expatriate footballers
Expatriate footballers in Greece